Mason Township is one of sixteen townships in Cerro Gordo County, Iowa, USA.  As of the 2000 census, its population was 464.

Geography
It is the smallest township in area in the county. Mason City, the county seat, borders it to the north. A very tiny exclave of the township actually lies just northeast of Mason City.

References

External links
 US-Counties.com
 City-Data.com

Townships in Cerro Gordo County, Iowa
Mason City, Iowa micropolitan area
Townships in Iowa